Chandan Singh Rawat (26 July 1928 – 24 July 2008) was an Indian footballer. He competed in the men's tournament at the 1952 Summer Olympics.

Honours
East Bengal
IFA Shield: 1951

India
Asian Games Gold medal: 1951
Colombo Cup: 1953, 1954

References

External links
 

1928 births
2008 deaths
Indian footballers
India international footballers
Olympic footballers of India
Footballers at the 1952 Summer Olympics
People from Darjeeling
Indian Gorkhas
Footballers from West Bengal
Association football midfielders
Footballers at the 1951 Asian Games
Footballers at the 1954 Asian Games
Medalists at the 1951 Asian Games
Asian Games gold medalists for India
Asian Games medalists in football
East Bengal Club players
Mohun Bagan AC players
Calcutta Football League players